Adrianus "Adrie" Klem (born 6 May 1951) is a Dutch rower. He competed in the men's coxed four event at the 1976 Summer Olympics.

References

External links
 

1951 births
Living people
Dutch male rowers
Olympic rowers of the Netherlands
Rowers at the 1976 Summer Olympics
Sportspeople from Delft